Shyganak is a village in Sarysu District, Jambyl Region, Kazakhstan. It is the administrative center of the Kamkala rural district. (KATO code - 316039100). Population:

Geography
The village lies on the lower course of the Chu river. It is located at the northern end of lake Ulken Kamkaly by the eastern shore of lake Kishi Kamkaly,  to the northeast of Zhanatas, the district capital.

References

Populated places in Jambyl Region
Chu (river)